The thirteenth cycle of America's Next Top Model  premiered on September 9, 2009 and was  the seventh season to be aired on The CW network. The cycle's catch phrase is "'The Lineup Is 5' 7" And Under. Not The Usual Suspects. BOOK 'EM!", and the promotional song was "Good Girls Go Bad" by Cobra Starship featuring Leighton Meester. The ending/elimination song, entitled "Top Model", is sung by Marvin Fequiere, husband of cycle 10 contestant Stacy-Ann Fequiere.

The prizes for this cycle are:

 A modeling contract with Wilhelmina Models, replacing Elite Model Management
 A fashion spread and cover in Seventeen
 A 100,000 contract with CoverGirl cosmetics

The destination for this cycle was Wailea, Maui, Hawaii, making this the first cycle to be filmed entirely in the United States.

The winner was Nicole Fox from Louisville, Colorado making her the youngest winner at the age of 18. Laura Kirkpatrick placed as the runner up.

Season summary
This cycle featured one major change to the judging panel: judge Paulina Porizkova left the show after the previous season, marking the first change to the judging panel since Cycle 10. With her departure, only three permanent judges remained, a first for the series.

This cycle also moved back to Los Angeles, after being filmed in New York City for cycle 12. The cast size was once again increased to 14 contestants. All of the contestants for this season were of height 5'7" or shorter.

Contestants
(Ages stated are at start of contest)

Episodes

Summaries

Call-out order

 The contestant was eliminated
 The contestant was immune from elimination
 The contestant was eliminated outside of the judging panel
 The contestant quit the competition
 The contestant won the competition

Bottom two

 The contestant was eliminated after their first time in the bottom two
 The contestant was eliminated after their second time in the bottom two
 The contestant was eliminated after their third time in the bottom two
 The contestant was eliminated after their fourth time in the bottom two
 The contestant was eliminated in the final judging and placed as the runner-up

Average  call-out order
Casting call-out order and final two are not included.

Photo shoot guide
Episode 1 photo shoot: Runway shots/Polaroid shots (casting)
Episode 2 photo shoot: Re-enacting baby photos
Episode 3 photo shoot: Posing topless on a horse
Episode 4 photo shoot: Elongating oneself
Episode 5 photo shoot: Beauty shots with fabric
Episode 6 photo shoot: Cirque du Soleil Mystère
Episode 7 photo shoot: Ninja warriors
Episode 8 commercial:  CoverGirl exact eyelights collection
Episode 9 photo shoot: Biracial Hapas
Episode 10 photo shoot: Posing underwater
Episode 11 photo shoot: Pele, Goddess of volcanoes
Episode 12 photo shoots & Commercial: CoverGirl lashblast mascara & Seventeen Magazine cover

Makeovers

 Lisa – Trimmed
 Rachel – Long wavy dark brown extensions
 Courtney – Cut shorter and dyed red 
 Lulu – Shoulder length weave with bangs
 Bianca – Bleached eyebrows
 Ashley – Long, straight middle-part black weave
 Kara – Blonde highlights 
 Rae – Dyed ice blonde with bleached eyebrows
 Brittany – Trimmed and dyed chocolate brown
 Sundai – Rihanna inspired cut
 Jennifer – Cut off dead ends and eyebrows shortened
 Erin – Dyed ice blonde with bleached eyebrows
 Laura – Added different colors of highlights
 Nicole – Super curly and dyed red

Cast Members
 Jay Manuel – photo shoot director

Post-Top Model careers
 Jennifer An has modeled for Knitscene Magazine and taken a few test shots. She was also a model for a skit on Late Night with Jimmy Fallon.
 Lulu Braithwaite has modeled for D.A.M. Magazine, Issue 12.
 Courtney Davies is signed with Wilhelmina Models in Miami and LA. She has appeared in Glamour, Atlantic Ave Magazine, Short Hair Guide, Fashion Market Magazine, and Venue Magazine. She also appeared in the ABC family TV series Pretty Little Liars as Quinn in a recurring role for 2 episodes in 2011.
 Rachel Echelberger has been signed with BMG Models in New York.
 Nicole Fox is currently signed with Wilhelmina Models. She received a six-page spread in Seventeen Magazine, and an ad for Cover Girl Lash Blast Mascara. She has also modeled for Illiterate Magazine, in which she had a spread, and been featured on AOL.com, More magazine and in OK! Magazine. She was featured in Wild Fox Couture's 2010 fall collection lookbook along with models Rachel Ballinger and Daria Plyushko.
 Ashley Howard has done some modelling work but since then has gone back to her job as a dance teacher.
 Laura Kirkpatrick has been signed to Wünder Model Management and AB/FAB Management. She has received several representation offers from modeling agencies, including Tyra Banks' Bankable Productions. She has also taken part for some charity print work for 2010 Haiti earthquake relief. In 2011, she participated in America's Next Top Model, Cycle 17 with several returning models. Laura is now raising a daughter as a single mother.
 Sundai Love is taking a few more shots, as she did some modeling work previously. She's also been on the cover of Bella Petite Magazine. She can be seen in the music video "Dirty Picture" by Taio Cruz. Sundai is currently based in Japan and works as a travel blogger.
 Brittany Markert is signed with Passport Model Management in San Francisco, Paragon Model Management in Mexico and has modeled for an editorial in Harper's Bazaar.
 Lisa Ramos is signed with Basic Model Management in New York and Elite Model Management in Miami, has done some test shots and print work for a summer magazine. She's also been in Seventeen Magazine and modeled for Ideeli.com, Anjel's Hair Salon, Capture and Create Magazine, Peony Red, Me & Thee, Spring/Summer 2010, W25 Magazine (June 2010) and Supermodels Unlimited.
 Bianca Richardson is signed with Wilhelmina Models and Pink Models. She has modeled for Mallard Magazine and Betsey Johnson.
 Kara Vincent has taken a few test shots and has been signed to Paragon Model Management in Mexico City. 
 Erin Wagner has been signed with Wilhelmina Models and Paragon Models and has done some test shots. She can be seen in an ad for Editor's Closet for sunglasses, as well.
 Rae Weisz has modeled for Rochester Magazine in 2009.

Notes

References

External links
Official website

A13
2009 American television seasons
Television shows filmed in California
Television shows shot in the Las Vegas Valley
Television shows filmed in Hawaii